Carlo Scott (born 5 June 1980 in Cape Town, Western Cape) is a South African association football striker who played in the Premier Soccer League for Cape Town Spurs, Ajax Cape Town, Sundowns, Moroka Swallows, Santos, and Bloemfontein Celtic. He later played for Ikapa Sporting in the National First Division.

His younger brother Romano also played for Santos.

References

1980 births
South African soccer players
South Africa international soccer players
Living people
Sportspeople from Cape Town
Association football forwards
Bloemfontein Celtic F.C. players
Cape Town Spurs F.C. players
Mamelodi Sundowns F.C. players
Moroka Swallows F.C. players
Ikapa Sporting F.C. players